is a private university in Sasebo, Nagasaki, Japan, established in 2000.

External links
 Official website

Educational institutions established in 2000
Private universities and colleges in Japan
Universities and colleges in Nagasaki Prefecture
2000 establishments in Japan